For bicycle accessories see:

 Accessories
 Accessories, repairs, and tools
 Bicycle Tools